The Department of Tourism, Culture, Arts, Gaeltacht, Sport and Media is a department of the Government of Ireland. The mission of the department is to promote and develop Ireland's tourism, culture, and art; and to advance the use of the Irish language, including the development of the Gaeltacht. It is led by the Minister for Tourism, Culture, Arts, Gaeltacht, Sport and Media.

Departmental team
The official headquarters and ministerial offices of the department are on Kildare Street, Dublin. The department also has offices in South Frederick Street in Dublin, Na Forbacha in Galway and in New Road, Killarney, County Kerry. The departmental team consists of the following:
Minister for Tourism, Culture, Arts, Gaeltacht, Sport and Media: Catherine Martin, TD
Minister of State for the Gaeltacht: Patrick O'Donovan, TD
Minister of State for Sport and Physical Education: Thomas Byrne, TD
Secretary General of the Department: Katherine Licken

Overview
In carrying out its mandate the department undertakes a variety of functions including:
formulation, development and evaluation of policy and structures to promote and foster the practice and appreciation of the creative and interpretative arts and to encourage the development of the Irish film industry;
enabling the national cultural institutions to preserve and protect Ireland's movable heritage and cultural assets;
creating an environment enabling the National Cultural Institutions to flourish through the provision of financial resources and an appropriate policy framework.

The department is responsible for funding national cultural institutions such as:
National Gallery of Ireland
National Library of Ireland
National Museum of Ireland
and organisations such as:
Arts Council of Ireland (which also acts as the "Cultural Contact Point" to access EU cultural programme funding);
Culture Ireland

History
The department was created by the Ministers and Secretaries (Amendment) Act 1977 as the Department of Economic Planning and Development, an act of the 15th Government of Ireland led by Jack Lynch. This act provided its function as:

Over the years the name and functions of the department have changed several times.

References

External links
Department of Tourism, Culture, Arts, Gaeltacht, Sport and Media
Structure of the Department

 
Tourism, Culture, Arts, Gaeltacht, Sport and Media
Ireland
Ireland
Ministries established in 1977
Cultural heritage of Ireland
1977 establishments in Ireland
Ireland